Zhejiang Jonway Automobile Co., Ltd., trading as Jonway Automobile, is a Chinese automobile manufacturer founded in 2003 and based in Taizhou, Zhejiang.

History
The Jonway Automobile represents the automotive division of the Jonway Group created in 2005. The first product launched on the market was the model Jonway UFO A380 a copy (not licensed) of the second generation Toyota RAV4 (XA20) proposed in both three-door short wheelbase and five-door long wheelbase. The car immediately got high media exposure because of the similarity with the original Japanese model in every detail.

The model was subsequently exported to many Asian markets and also appeared in Europe at the International Motor Show Germany 2007 in Frankfurt am Main. Also in 2007, Jonway and DR Motor Company signed an agreement for the assembly of the UFO three-door in Macchia d'Isernia in Italy in a restyled and re-homologated version for European standards; the car renamed DR3 was unveiled at the concept car stage at the Bologna Motor Show 2007. However, the negotiations with DR Motor failed and the project for the European UFO/DR3 was abandoned.

In July 2010, the American manufacturer ZAP acquired 51% of Jonway Automobile and the joint venture ZAP-Jonway was created, specializing in the construction of electric cars; the first product was the A380 EV launched on the Chinese market.

In 2012, Jonway bought the historic "Viotti" name belonging to Carrozzeria Viotti and relaunched the company, establishing new headquarters in Rivoli, in the province of Turin. The new company represented the European division of Jonway as well as the research and development center specializing in the design of hybrid vehicles, and in the engineering of sports cars. Emanuele Bomboi is hired as head of design. It signed an agreement with the Maggiora coachbuilder to make a deep restyling of its UFO-A380 model. The model exhibited at the concept car stadium was to go into production at the end of 2013. In May of the same year, it launched a minivan called Wuxing on the Chinese market.

In 2013, it presented a second SUV named Falcon based on the mechanics and body of the A380 but with a completely new exterior and interior design.

In 2014 it sells the shares of Viotti to the Fabbrica Italiana Automobili Maggiora S.r.l.

Products 
Jonway Automobile products are listed as follows:

Jonway A380 - compact crossover
Jonway Falcon - compact crossover
Jonway Wuxing - compact MPV

References

External links

Official website of the Zhejiang Jonway Automobile

Car manufacturers of China
Companies based in Zhejiang
Vehicle manufacturing companies established in 2005
Chinese brands
2005 establishments in China